Wurmbea cernua is a species of plant in the Colchicaceae family that is endemic to Australia.

Description
The species is a cormous perennial herb that grows to a height of 3.5–10 cm. Its white to pink flowers appear from May to June.

Distribution and habitat
The species is found in the Coolgardie, Esperance Plains, Jarrah Forest and Mallee IBRA bioregions of southern Western Australia. It grows on wet sandy soils and granite outcrops.

References

cernua
Monocots of Australia
Angiosperms of Western Australia
Plants described in 1980
Taxa named by Terry Desmond Macfarlane